Late at Night may refer to:

Albums
 Late at Night (Billy Preston album), a 1979 album by American musician Billy Preston
 Late at Night (Dover album), a 1999 album by Spanish rock band Dover

Songs
 "Late at Night" (Electronic song), a 1999 song by British band Electronic
 "Late at Night" (Roddy Ricch song), a 2021 song by American rapper Roddy Ricch
 "Late at Night" (George Benson and Vicki Randle song), on the 1983 album In Your Eyes